
Rypin County is a unit of territorial administration and local government (powiat) in Kuyavian-Pomeranian Voivodeship, north-central Poland. It came into being on January 1, 1999, as a result of the Polish local government reforms passed in 1998.

As of 2019 its total population is 43,618, out of which the population of Rypin is 16,227 and the rural population is 27,391.

Neighbouring counties
Rypin County is bordered by Brodnica County to the north, Żuromin County to the east, Sierpc County to the south-east, Lipno County to the south-west and Golub-Dobrzyń County to the west.

Administrative division
The county is subdivided into six gminas (one urban and five rural). These are listed in the following table, in descending order of population.

References

 
Rypin